Sphondylia is a genus of beetles in the family Megalopodidae, containing the following species:

 Sphondylia afer (Klug, 1824)
 Sphondylia angolensis Weise, 1919
 Sphondylia atricornis Pic, 1951
 Sphondylia balyana (Westwood, 1864)
 Sphondylia barbipes Weise, 1915
 Sphondylia basalis Clavareau, 1909
 Sphondylia bicoloriventris Pic, 1937
 Sphondylia fasciaticollis (Jacoby, 1901)
 Sphondylia henrardi Pic, 1951
 Sphondylia inlineata Pic, 1939
 Sphondylia jacobyi Clavareau, 1905
 Sphondylia lineatithorax Pic, 1953
 Sphondylia magnicollis Weise, 1902
 Sphondylia mutillaria (Clark, 1865)
 Sphondylia pubimaculata Erber & Medvedev, 2002
 Sphondylia schulzi Weise, 1902
 Sphondylia sobrina (Harold, 1880)
 Sphondylia testacea Pic, 1912
 Sphondylia thoreyi (Baly, 1864)
 Sphondylia tomentosa (Lacordaire, 1845)
 Sphondylia vaneyeni Pic, 1951
 Sphondylia varians Weise, 1919
 Sphondylia ventralis Weise, 1902

References

Megalopodidae genera
Taxa named by Julius Weise